Petra Merkert is a West German para-alpine skier. She represented West Germany at alpine skiing at the 1976 Winter Paralympics held in Örnsköldsvik, Sweden.

She won gold medals at the Alpine Combination IV B event, the Giant Slalom IV B and the Slalom IV B event. She was the only competitor and only medalist at each of these events.

Achievements

See also 
 List of Paralympic medalists in alpine skiing

References 

Living people
Year of birth missing (living people)
Place of birth missing (living people)
Paralympic alpine skiers of Germany
Alpine skiers at the 1976 Winter Paralympics
Medalists at the 1976 Winter Paralympics
Paralympic gold medalists for West Germany
Paralympic medalists in alpine skiing
20th-century German women